ATL & BTL Agencies refer to two different styles of marketing agencies, especially in promotion marketing and communication.

"ATL" stands for "Above The Line", meaning that the advertising is going to be deployed around a wider target audience, e.g. television (TVC), radio, or billboards. applicable when a product is directed for a broader spectrum of consumers, for example a soft drink company might contract an ATL advertising agency to develop ads targeting a broad audience.

"BTL", or "Below The Line", suggests that the advertising is going to target a specific group of potential consumers. BTL advertising agencies will be hired to help companies to develop ads and promotion strategies in a creative way, directed to certain groups of, using tools like direct emailing, or direct product demonstrations for a specific group of people, like giving away vitamin samples at the door of a famous gym.

References

Promotion and marketing communications